Burliuk is a surname of Ukrainian origin. Notable people with the surname include:

 David Burliuk (1882–1967), Ukrainian painter
 Nikolai Burliuk (1890–1920), Ukrainian poet, linguist, and artist
 Wladimir Burliuk (1886–1917), Ukrainian painter

Ukrainian-language surnames